The Journal of Refractive Surgery is a monthly peer-reviewed medical journal covering refractive and lens-based optical surgery. It is published by Slack and is the official journal of the International Society of Refractive Surgery, a partner of the American Academy of Ophthalmology.

History
The journal was established in 1985 as the Journal of Refractive Surgery and renamed Refractive & Corneal Surgery in 1989. It was again renamed in 1994 as the Journal of Refractive & Corneal Surgery, then reverted to its original and current title in 1995.

Abstracting and indexing
The journal is abstracted and indexed in:

According to the Journal Citation Reports, the journal has a 2017 impact factor of 2.649.

References

External links

English-language journals
Ophthalmology journals
Publications established in 1985
Monthly journals